The Cléden-Poher Parish close (enclos paroissial) comprises the Église Notre-Dame de l'Assomption, a calvary and an ossuary, and is located in the arrondissement of Châteaulin in Finistère  in Brittany in north-western France. It is a listed historical monument since 1983.

The Église Notre-Dame-de-l’Assomption was restored and modified in 1689 and in 1907.

The north porch
This porch contains statues of Catherine of Sienna, Saint Francis of Assisi and Saint Dominic.

The west façade
There are two double doors here which gives access to the church. The tympanum contains a statue of the Virgin Mary.

The master altar
This comprises three scenes; The procession to Golgotha, the crucifixion and a mise au tombeau; Jesus being prepared for burial.

The ossuary
The ossuary, partly gothic and partly renaissance in style, is located in the north east corner of the cemetery.

The calvary
This dates to 1575 and depicts various scenes from the passion including the Flagellation, a scene showing the cross being carried to Golgotha and Jesus on the cross. Angels collect Jesus' blood into chalices.

Gallery

References

See also

Culture of France
French architecture
History of France
Religion in France
Roman Catholicism in France

Churches in Finistère
Calvaries in Brittany
Parish closes in Brittany